Khoshkin (also Romanized as Khoshkīn; also known as Khoshkin Marivan, Khowshgen, Khowshkīn, Khvoshkīn, Vashkhar, Veshkīn, and Vishkīn) is a village in Dezli Rural District, in the Central District of Sarvabad County, Kurdistan Province, Iran. At the 2006 census, its population was 118, in 24 families. The village is populated by Kurds.

References 

Towns and villages in Sarvabad County
Kurdish settlements in Kurdistan Province